The 1958–59 NHL season was the 42nd season of the National Hockey League. Six teams each played 70 games. The Montreal Canadiens were the Stanley Cup champions as they beat the Toronto Maple Leafs four games to one in the best-of-seven final series. This marked the fourth consecutive Stanley Cup win for the Canadiens as they became the first team to win four in a row.

League business
The NHL and the Canadian Amateur Hockey Association (CAHA) negotiated a new professional-amateur agreement, since the previous deal had expired in 1955, and the groups had operated on a gentleman's agreement. CAHA secretary George Dudley announced that NHL would pay C$40,000 towards developing amateur players, and the agreement set rules for negotiation lists and reserve lists and an earlier deadline to decide which players might be moved from a junior team to a professional team. The CAHA agreed that amateurs aged 17 and older would use same rules as the professionals except for overtime.

Regular season
The Toronto Maple Leafs, last-place finishers the previous season, brought up Johnny Bower to share goaltending duties with Ed Chadwick and bolstered the defence by adding Carl Brewer and Allan Stanley to aid Tim Horton and Bobby Baun. 

Ralph Backstrom and Jean Beliveau each had two goals apiece in a 9–1 Montreal win at the Montreal Forum on October 23. Rudy Pilous, coach of the Black Hawks, was displeased with his team's performance and fined his team $100 for the poor performance.

Beliveau had a hat trick November 29 as Montreal beat Detroit 6–2 at the Forum. Gordie Howe was injured in a collision with Doug Harvey near the end of the first period and was taken to hospital, returning for the third period. The next night, Montreal defeated the Red Wings 7–0 as Jacques Plante got his third shutout of the season.

On January 3, Harvey was back in the Canadiens' lineup and scored two goals in a 5–1 win over the New York Rangers at the Forum.  In the last minute of play, Plante got two penalties, one of them a major that sparked the fight. Jimmy Bartlett had skated into Plante, and Plante retaliated by punching Bartlett, provoking a bench-clearing brawl. Referee Dalton McArthur gave Bartlett a double major, one for charging and one for fighting, and a misconduct penalty. 

On February 1, the Rangers downed the Red Wings 5–4 at Madison Square Garden. Lou Fontinato became incensed when Gordie Howe struck Eddie Shack with his stick, and challenged the right wing.  Howe broke Fontinato's nose in the fight. On February 5, the Rangers beat the Wings 5–0 on Worsley's shutout. Detroit coach Sid Abel, formerly Howe's centerman, fined 14 players $100 each for playing what he described as "the worst game of hockey he had seen in 20 years".

On February 15 at Madison Square Garden, Worsley had Montreal shut out with ten minutes remaining. Then the Canadiens scored 5 goals to win 5–1. Coach Phil Watson ordered every player except Worsley out on the ice for an after-game workout. Watson said Worsley hadn't played so badly. General manager Muzz Patrick said the workout was in lieu of fines.

With five games left in the season, the Rangers had a seven-point lead over Toronto. Then the Rangers went into a tailspin, and the Leafs got hot. The key game was played March 19 between Toronto and the Canadiens. Plante could not play due to a severe case of boils, and so the Canadiens used Claude Pronovost in goal. He let in five goals before coach Toe Blake replaced him in the third period with Claude Cyr; it was Cyr's first and last NHL game. Toronto won 6–3. The Canadiens brought up Charlie Hodge from the Montreal Royals and on March 22, he beat the Rangers 4–2. The Rangers still had a chance to make the playoffs if Detroit beat Toronto. The Leafs won 6–4 and ousted the Rangers from the playoffs.

The Montreal Canadiens again won the regular season standings; their players dominated the All-Star nominations (with six of a possible twelve, the same number as in 1956) and trophies as Jacques Plante won his fourth straight Vezina Trophy, Tom Johnson won the James Norris Memorial Trophy, ending teammate Doug Harvey's four-year monopoly, and Dickie Moore won the Art Ross Trophy, setting a new record for total points in a season: with a 41-goal, 55-assist campaign, Moore broke Howe's league record by a single point.

This season marked the final time until 1967 with an active player who had played for a team not in the Original Six. Former Brooklyn Americans player Ken Mosdell suited up for two postseason games for the Canadiens that year, and retired after Montreal won the Cup.

Final standings

Playoffs

Playoff bracket

Semifinals

(1) Montreal Canadiens vs. (3) Chicago Black Hawks
Following game six, Ottawa Journal sports editor Bill Westwick quoted league president Clarence Campbell as accusing the referee Red Storey of "freezing" in the final minutes of the near-riotous game. Storey subsequently resigned as a referee. Campbell stated that Westwick took the words out of context, accused him of "breaking confidence" in the article. Westwick's fellow newsmen defended his article and did not question its veracity.

(2) Boston Bruins vs. (4) Toronto Maple Leafs

Stanley Cup Finals

Awards

All-Star teams

Player statistics

Scoring leaders
Note: GP = Games played, G = Goals, A = Assists, Pts = Points, PIM = Penalties in minutes

Leading goaltenders

Note: GP = Games played; Min = Minutes played; GA = Goals against; GAA = Goals against average; W = Wins; L = Losses; T = Ties; SO = Shutouts

Coaches
Boston Bruins: Milt Schmidt
Chicago Black Hawks: Rudy Pilous
Detroit Red Wings: Sid Abel
Montreal Canadiens: Toe Blake
New York Rangers: Phil Watson
Toronto Maple Leafs: Punch Imlach

Debuts
The following is a list of players of note who played their first NHL game in 1958–59 (listed with their first team, asterisk(*) marks debut in playoffs):
Stan Mikita, Chicago Black Hawks
John McKenzie, Chicago Black Hawks
Bill Hicke*, Montreal Canadiens
Eddie Shack, New York Rangers

Last games
The following is a list of players of note that played their last game in the NHL in 1958–59 (listed with their last team):
Earl Reibel, Boston Bruins
Real Chevrefils, Boston Bruins
Danny Lewicki, Chicago Black Hawks
Gus Mortson, Detroit Red Wings
Kenny Mosdell, Montreal Canadiens (Last active from the New York Americans/ Brooklyn Americans and last player from the pre-Original Six era.)
Wally Hergesheimer, New York Rangers

See also 
 1958-59 NHL transactions
 List of Stanley Cup champions
 National Hockey League All-Star Game
 1958 in sports
 1959 in sports

References

 
 
 
 

 

 
Notes

External links
Hockey Database
NHL.com

 
1958–59 in American ice hockey by league
1958–59 in Canadian ice hockey by league